Chionodes braunella is a moth in the family Gelechiidae. It is found in North America, where it has been recorded from Alberta and British Columbia to Colorado, Arizona, California and to Washington, southern Ontario and Maine.

The larvae feed on Lupinus albifrons, Lupinus arboreus, Lupinus chamissionis, Lupinus excubitus, Lupinus ornatus, Lupinus peirsonii, Lupinus varicolor, Lotus scoparius, Trifolium eriocephalum, Trifolium wormskioldii, Vicia americana, Lathyrus vestitus, Lathyrus sulphureus and Gaylussacia species.

References

Chionodes
Moths described in 1931
Moths of North America